Ingela Nylund Watz (born 1962) is a Swedish Social Democratic Party politician.

She was elected member of the Riksdag for the period 2010–2026, from the Stockholm County constituency.

References

1962 births
Living people
Members of the Riksdag from the Social Democrats
Women members of the Riksdag
Members of the Riksdag 2010–2014
Members of the Riksdag 2014–2018
Members of the Riksdag 2018–2022
Members of the Riksdag 2022–2026
21st-century Swedish women politicians